Anoka County is the fourth-most-populous county in the U.S. state of Minnesota. As of the 2020 census, the population was 363,887. The county seat and namesake of the county is the city of Anoka, which is derived from the Dakota word anokatanhan meaning "on (or from) both sides," referring to its location on the banks of the Rum River. The largest city in the county is Blaine, the thirteenth-largest city in Minnesota and the eighth-largest Twin Cities suburb.

Anoka County comprises the north portion of the Minneapolis–Saint Paul statistical area, the largest metropolitan area in the state and the sixteenth-largest in the United States with about 3.64 million residents.

The county is bordered by the counties of Isanti on the north, Chisago and Washington on the east, Hennepin and Ramsey on the south, Sherburne on the west, and the Mississippi River on the southwest. The Rum River cuts through the county and was the site of many early European settlements. It was a common route to the Mille Lacs Lake, the spiritual homeland of the Ojibwe people. Father Louis Hennepin traveled the river in his first exploration of the region. The area became a center of fur trade and logging as French and French Canadian communities grew in the cities of Anoka and Centerville. Organized in 1857, the county's southern border eventually met Minneapolis and has become a predominantly suburban area following the construction of Interstate 35W. The county is home to local Twin Cities destinations such as the Heights Theater in Columbia Heights and Northtown Mall and the National Sports Center in Blaine.

History
Anoka County was organized by an act of the Minnesota Territorial Legislature on May 23, 1857, the year prior to Minnesota's admission to the Union. It was formed from parts of Ramsey County and Benton County; the Rum River previously divided the line between the two counties. The boundaries were mainly the same as they are now, except for a small part of the southeastern tip along the Mississippi River and at the south, formerly known as Manomin County. It was a small portion that connected to Ramsey and occupied one-third of the congressional township. It was then attached to Anoka County by constitutional amendment November 2, 1869. It became known as Fridley in 1879.

The first European descendants to explore what is now Anoka County were the Franciscan friar Louis Hennepin and his party. Fur traders soon began to settle in the area which is now Ramsey County. They settled on the Rum River and more people were attracted to the area. A community was created which is now called Anoka.

Geography

The Mississippi River flows southeasterly along the county's southwestern boundary. The Rum River flows southerly through the western part of the county, discharging into the Mississippi at the county's southwestern boundary. The terrain consists of low rolling wooded hills. The terrain slopes to the south and east; its highest point is a small hillock 1.2 mile (1.9 km) east of the county's northwest corner, at 1,100' (335m) ASL. Otherwise the terrain's highest point is along the western part of the north boundary line, at 1,083' (330m) ASL.

Lakes

 Bunker Lake
 Cedar Lake
 Coon Lake
 Crooked Lake
 Ham Lake
 Laddie Lake
 Lake George
 McKay Lake
 Moore Lake
 Round Lake
 Spring Lake
 Smith Lake

Rivers

 Cedar Creek
 Coon Creek
 Crooked Brook
 Ford Brook
 Hardwood Creek
 Mahoney Brook
 Mississippi River
 Rice Creek
 Rum River
 Sand Creek
 Seelye Brook
 Trott Brook
 Pheasant creek

Major highways

  Interstate 35
  Interstate 35E
  Interstate 35W
  Interstate 694
  US Highway 10
  US Highway 169
  Minnesota State Highway 47
  Minnesota State Highway 65
  Minnesota State Highway 97
  Minnesota State Highway 610
 List of county roads

Adjacent counties

 Isanti County - north
 Chisago County - northeast
 Washington County - east
 Ramsey County - southeast
 Hennepin County - southwest
 Sherburne County - northwest

Protected areas

 Bethel Wildlife Management Area
 Boot Lake Scientific and Natural Area
 Bunker Hills Regional Park
 Carl E Bonnell Wildlife Management Area
 Carlos Avery State Wildlife Management Area
 Cedar Creek Conservation Area
 Coon Rapids Dam Regional Park
 East Bethel Booster Park
 Gordie Mikkelson Wildlife Management Area
 Helen Allison Savanna Scientific and Natural Area
 Lake George Regional Park
 Martin Island-Linwood Lakes Regional Park
 Mississippi National River and Recreation Area (part)
 Rice Creek Chain of Lakes Park Preserve
 Robert and Marilyn Burman Wildlife Management Area

Climate and weather

Anoka County has a hot-summer humid continental climate zone (Dfa in the Köppen climate classification), typical of southern parts of the Upper Midwest, and is situated in USDA plant hardiness zone 4b. As is typical in a continental climate, the difference between average temperatures in the coldest winter month and the warmest summer month is great: .

Demographics

2020 census

Note: the US Census treats Hispanic/Latino as an ethnic category. This table excludes Latinos from the racial categories and assigns them to a separate category. Hispanics/Latinos can be of any race.

The 2000 United States census listed 298,084 people, 106,428 households, and 79,395 families in the county. The population density was 705 sq mi (272/km2). There were 108,091 housing units at an average density of 256/sqmi (98.7/km2). The 2010 United States Census found that 330,844 people were in the county.

At the time of the 2000 Census, the racial makeup of the county was 93.64 percent white, 1.60 percent black or African American, 0.70 percent Native American, 1.69 percent Asian, 0.02 percent Pacific Islander, 0.65 percent from other races, and 1.71 percent from two or more races, and 1.66 percent of the population were Hispanic or Latino of any race. The 2000 Census found 30.2 percent were of German, 14.3 percent Norwegian, 9.0 percent Swedish, 7.3 percent Irish and 5.9 percent Polish ancestry.

There were 106,428 households, out of which 39.90% had children under the age of 18 living with them, 60.70% were married couples living together, 9.80% had a female householder with no husband present, and 25.40% were non-families. Of all households, 19.30% were made up of individuals, and 5.30% had someone living alone who was 65 years of age or older. The average household size was 2.77 and the average family size was 3.19.

The county population contained 28.90% under the age of 18, 8.30% from 18 to 24, 34.10% from 25 to 44, 21.60% from 45 to 64, and 7.10% who were 65 years of age or older. The median age was 34 years. For every 100 females there were 101.10 males. For every 100 females age 18 and over, there were 99.30 males.

The median income for a household in the county was $57,754, and the median income for a family was $64,261. Males had a median income of $41,527 versus $30,534 for females. The per capita income for the county was $23,297. About 2.90% of families and 4.20% of the population were below the poverty line, including 4.90% of those under age 18 and 4.50% of those age 65 or over.

Government and politics
Anoka County was once one of the most Democratic suburban counties in any metro area nationwide and one of the rare few to have trended Republican since the 21st century. On a national level, Anoka County has voted for the Republican presidential candidate from 2000 onward, with the margins remaining relatively close outside of 2016. However, incumbent Democratic-Farmer-Labor Senator Amy Klobuchar defeated Jim Newberger by over 20,000 votes here in the 2018 midterms; Klobuchar also won this county in 2006 and 2012. Despite this, Republican Karin Housley narrowly defeated Democrat Tina Smith in the concurrent Senate special election in 2018, despite Smith winning the overall election by a margin of over 10 points.

County Commissioners
As of June 2019
 District 1 (western Anoka, Bethel, Nowthen, western Oak Grove, Ramsey, Saint Francis) - Matt Look
 District 2 (northeastern Andover, northern Blaine, East Bethel, Ham Lake, eastern Oak Grove) - Julie Braastad
 District 3 (central Blaine, northern Fridley, Spring Lake Park) - Robyn West
 District 4 (Columbia Heights, Fridley, Hilltop, part of Spring Lake Park) - Mandy Meisner
 District 5 (southern Andover and eastern Coon Rapids) - Mike Gamache
 District 6 (southeastern Blaine, Centerville, Circle Pines, Columbus, Lexington, Lino Lakes, Linwood) - Jeff Reinert
 District 7 (eastern Anoka, western Andover and western Coon Rapids) - Scott Schulte, Chair

National elections

Communities

Cities

 Andover
 Anoka
 Bethel
 Blaine (Partially in Ramsey County)
 Centerville
 Circle Pines
 Columbia Heights
 Columbus
 Coon Rapids
 East Bethel
 Fridley
 Ham Lake
 Hilltop
 Lexington
 Lino Lakes
 Nowthen
 Oak Grove
 Ramsey
 Saint Francis (Partially in Isanti County)
 Spring Lake Park (Partially  in Ramsey County)

Township
 Linwood Township

Census-designated place
 Martin Lake

Unincorporated community
 Linwood

Education
School districts include:
 Anoka-Hennepin Public School District
 Centennial Public School District
 Columbia Heights Public School District
 Elk River School District
 Forest Lake Public School District
 Fridley Public School District
 Spring Lake Park Public Schools
 St. Francis Area Schools
 White Bear Lake School District

See also
 National Register of Historic Places listings in Anoka County, Minnesota

References

External links
 Anoka County government's website
 Anoka County Historical Society Digital Collection, Minnesota Reflections

 
Minneapolis–Saint Paul
Minnesota counties
Minnesota counties on the Mississippi River
Minnesota placenames of Native American origin
1857 establishments in Minnesota Territory
Populated places established in 1857